was a general in the Imperial Japanese Army in World War II. Japanese forces under Yanagawa's command committed the 1937 Nanking Massacre.

Biography
Born in what is now part of Nagasaki city, Nagasaki prefecture, Yanagawa was raised in Ōita Prefecture by his adoptive parents. He graduated from the 12th class of the Imperial Japanese Army Academy in 1900, and served in combat during the Russo-Japanese War of 1904–1905. He graduated from the 24th class of the Army Staff College in 1912. After serving as an instructor in the Army Cavalry School, he was appointed a military attaché to China and served as an instructor at the Beijing Army College in 1918. He later traveled to Europe as part of Japan’s delegation to the Versailles Peace Treaty negotiations, and from 1920 to 1923 was a member of Japan’s delegation to the League of Nations.

Around this time, he became involved in internal politics within the Japanese Army, and joined the Kodaha Faction, led by Sadao Araki, Jinsaburo Mazaki and Hideyoshi Obata.

From 1923 to 1925, Yanagawa was a cavalry officer, and rose steadily through the ranks from commanding the IJA 20th Cavalry Regiment in 1923, the IJA 1st Cavalry Brigade by 1927, the Cavalry School from 1929, to Inspector-General of Cavalry in 1930. He was promoted to lieutenant general in December 1931.

From 1932 to 1934, Yanagawa served as Vice-Minister of War. He was subsequently given a field posting as commander of the prestigious IJA 1st Division from 1934 to 1935. He commanded the Taiwan Army of Japan from 1935 to 1936, before his retirement on September 26, 1936.

However, with the Second Sino-Japanese War, Yanagawa was recalled to active service and assigned command of the IJA 10th Army in China in 1937–1938. The 10th Army comprised the 18th and 114th divisions from Japan, the IJA 6th Division from North China, and the Kunisaki Detachment of the IJA 5th Division, and landed in Hangzhou on November 5, 1937.

Yanagawa led his troops in pursuit of Chinese forces fleeing from the Shanghai area, and was in command of one of the main Japanese columns at the Battle of Nanjing. His troops were later implicated in the Nanjing Massacre, but Yanagawa was repelled by the events.

Yanagawa retired again from active military service in 1938, becoming Chief of the General Affairs Bureau, East Asia Development Board. Under the political patronage of Baron Hiranuma Kiichirō, and with support from the zaibatsu groups, he took over the Justice Ministry from  Akira Kazami. During this post in government he led the Keishicho (Tokyo Metropolitan Police Department).

Yanagawa was a supporter of State Shintoism, along with General Kuniaki Koiso and Hiranuma Kiichirō, and in the creation of the Shintoist Rites Research Council. He was also a leader in the Taisei Yokusankai (Imperial Rule Assistance Association) group.

In a 1985 interview of Yoshinaga Sunao who was a Staff Officer of the Japanese 10th Army, Sunao described Yanagawa as a "Great man who had his deepest respect" as well as a "Reticent and quiet hero". Further into the interview, it was stated by Sunao that Yanagawa loved China and while on the road to Nanjing, he personally said to his Staff officers that it wasn't desirable for Japan and China to have to fight each other, however, as a soldier, he felt it was still his duty to fight and as such readily marched on Nanjing.

References

Further reading

1870s births
1945 deaths
People from Ōita Prefecture
People from Nagasaki
Imperial Japanese Army generals of World War II
Japanese generals
Japanese military personnel of the Russo-Japanese War
Japanese military personnel of World War II
Ministers of Justice of Japan
Nanjing Massacre perpetrators